The Pan Asian Repertory Theatre is a New York City-based theatre group that explores the Asian-American experience and provides professional opportunities for Asian-American artists to collaborate. Pan-Asian was founded by Tisa Chang and Ernest Abuba in 1977, and Chang remains artistic director. Chang established the Pan Asian Repertory Theatre as a resident company at La MaMa Experimental Theatre Club in 1977, with the intention of popularizing Asian-American theater and leading to other similar theatre companies in cities with an Asian disaporic population. 

Specializing in intercultural productions of new Asian-American plays, Asian classics in translation, and innovative adaptations of Western classics, some of the works Pan Asian has presented included: 

Empress of China - featuring Tina Chen in the title role of China's last dowager ruler
Yellow Fever - continued to an Off-Broadway run
Ghashiram Kotwal - Marathi play with music
Teahouse - by Lao She, spanning fifty years of modern Chinese history
Cambodia Agonistes - by Ernest Abuba, music by Louis Stewart
The Teahouse of the August Moon - by John Patrick
Forbidden City Blues - by Alexander Woo
The Fan Tan King - by C. Y. Leethe, world premiere
Yohen - by Philip Kan Gotanda
Tea - by Velina Hasu Houston, 20th anniversary production
Ching Chong Chinaman at the Westside Theatre

Pan Asian has staged early works of writers including Momoko Iko, Wakako Yamauchi, Philip Kan Gotanda, R. A. Shiomi, and David Henry Hwang. When they established a residency program in 1987, Pan Asian became the United States' first resident Asian American theater company continuing with Chang's goal to showcase Asian American theater as having a role in the city's theater scene.

See also
 Asian American theatre

References

External links
 Pan Asian Repertory Theatre official website
 Pan Asian Repertory Theatre on La MaMa Archives Digital Collections

Off-Broadway theaters
Asian-American theatre
Theatre companies in New York City
1977 establishments in New York City